This is a list of Italian brands, which encompasses brand-name products and services produced by companies in Italy.

Italian brands

  Abarth 
  Abici 
  Accossato 
  Acqua di Parma 
  Acqua Minerale San Benedetto 
  Aeritalia 
  Aermacchi 
  Agip 
  Agusta 
  AgustaWestland 
  AGV (helmets)
  ALAN 
  Alenia Aermacchi 
  Alenia Aeronautica 
  Alessi 
  Alfa Romeo 
  Alitalia 
  Amarcord Brewery 
  Amedei 
  Amedei Porcelana 
  Angelini 
  Ansaldi 
  Michele Ansaldi 
  Ansaldo Energia 
  Ansaldo STS 
  AnsaldoBreda 
  Aprilia 
  Aquila Italiana 
  ARGO SpA 
  Ariston Thermo 
  Armani
  Armi Jager 
  Arrow  (motorcycle parts)
  Artemide 
  Assicurazioni Generali 
  Astra 
  Atala 
  Atlantic 
  Audio Analogue 
  Audison 
  Aurea  (cars)
  Auricchio 
  Aurora  (pens)
  Autobianchi
  Avio 
  Aviointeriors 
  Azienda Italiana Petroli Albanesi 
  Azienda Nazionale Idrogenazione Combustibili 
  Azimut Yachts 
  B&B Italia 
  Baglietto 
  Baldelli ceramics 
  Baldini & Castoldi 
  Baldinini 
  Balocco 
  Bandini Automobili 
   Barbanera Almanac
  Barilla Group 
  Bassetti
  Bburago 
  Benelli  (firearms)
  Benelli  (motorcycles)
  Benetti 
  Benetton Group 
  Bennet  (supermarket)
  Berco Spa 
  Beretta 
  Bertagni 
  Beta  (motorcycles)
  Bianchi Bicycles 
  Bimota 
  Birel
  Birra Ichnusa 
  Birra Menabrea 
  Birra Moretti 
  Birrificio Angelo Poretti 
  Bizzarrini 
  Bombrini-Parodi-Delfino 
  Bonfiglioli 
  Bontempi 
  Bontoni 
  Borile 
  Bormioli Rocco 
  Borrani 
  Borsalino 
  Boscolo Hotels 
  Bottecchia 
  Bottega Giotti 
  Bottega Veneta 
  BP Studio 
  Bracco 
  Bravo S.p.A. 
  Bremach 
  Brembo 
  Breton 
  Brioni 
  Brionvega 
  Brondi 
  Brumm 
  Brunello Cucinelli 
  Bticino 
  Buitoni 
  Bulgari 
  Cagiva 
  CAMP 
  Campagnolo 
  Candy
  Cantiere Navale Visentini 
  Cantieri Riuniti dell'Adriatico 
  Cantine Lungarotti Winery 
  Caproni 
  Caraceni 
  Carapelli 
  Carpigiani 
  Carraro Agritalia 
  Carrozzeria Colli 
  Carrozzeria Fissore 
  Carrozzeria Ghia 
  Cassina S.p.A. 
  Castagnari 
  Roberto Cavalli 
  Cecomp 
  Ceirano Fabbrica Automobili 
  Ceirano GB & C 
  Cementir 
  Ceriani 
  Cetra Records 
  Chiappa Firearms 
  Chiribiri 
  Cimbali 
  Cinelli 
  Cinemeccanica 
  Cinzano 
  Cirio 
  Cisitalia 
  Clément Tyres 
  CNH Industrial 
  Codecasa 
  Coin  (department store)
  Colnago 
  Columbus Tubing 
  Comau 
  Comus S.p.A. 
  Conad 
  Coppola Foods 
  Cosmi Americo & Figlio 
  Costume National 
  Crumar
  Cugini Randi
  Custom Line 
  CVS Ferrari 
  Dainese 
  Dal Negro 
  Damiani  (jewelry)
  Danieli 
  Danieli Automation 
  Davide Campari - Milano 
  De Cecco 
  De Rosa  (bicycles)
  De Simon 
  De Tomaso 
  De'Longhi 
  Dell'Orto 
  Della Ferrera
  Di Blasi Industriale 
  Diadora 
  Diatto 
  Diesel 
  Divella 
  Dolce & Gabbana 
  Ducati 
  Ducati Energia 
  Eca Sindel 
  Edison 
  Edoardo Raffinerie Garrone 
  Eko guitars 
  Elena Mirò 
  Ellesse 
  Enel 
  Eni 
  Erreà 
  Eurotech 
  Extè 
  Fabbri Group 
  Fabbrica Aeroplani Ing. O. Pomilio 
  Fabbrica Ligure Automobili Genova 
  Fabio Perini S.p.A. 
  Facchini Group 
  Falc 
  Falck Group 
  FAMARS 
  Fantic Motor 
  Farfisa
  Fastweb  (telecommunications)
  Fazioli 
  Fedrigoni 
  Fendi 
  Ferrania 
  Ferrari 
  Ferrari Belotti 
  Gianfranco Ferré 
  Ferrero SpA 
  Ferretti Group 
  Ferrovie dello Stato Italiane 
  Fiat Automobiles 
  Fiat Ferroviaria 
  Fiat Industrial 
  Fiat Powertrain Technologies 
  Fiat S.p.A. 
  Fila 
  Filippi Boats 
  Fincantieri 
  Fiocchi Munizioni 
  Fiol Prosecco 
  Fioravanti  (automotive)
  Fiorucci 
  Flexform 
  Fly Products 
  Fly Synthesis 
  Flying Legend 
  Fondmetal 
  Franchi  (firearms)
  Franco Tosi Meccanica 
  Fratelli Branca 
  Fratelli Ceirano 
  Fratelli Nardi 
  Frera 
  Frette 
  Fulcrum Wheels 
  Fulgor 
  Gaggia 
  Gancia 
  Garelli Motorcycles 
  Garlando 
  Gas Jeans 
  GCDS
  Geloso 
  Geox 
  Ghezzi & Brian 
  Giacomini 
  Gilera 
  Gio. Ansaldo & C. 
  Giulio Cocchi Spumanti 
  Giusto Manetti Battiloro 
  Givova 
  Goldoni 
  Gravati 
  Graziano Trasmissioni 
  Grecav 
  Grif Italia 
  Grimaldi Group 
  Grivel  (mountain climbing)
  Gruppo Riva 
  Gucci 
  Guerciotti 
  Gufram 
  Hertz mobile audio 
  Hoepli 
  Iceberg  (fashion house)
  Iliad Italia
  Illy 
  IMAM 
  Indesit Company 
  Industria Cartaria Pieretti 
  Innocenti 
  Intermarine 
  Intesa Sanpaolo 
  Intimissimi 
  Iride Bicycles 
  Isabel Garcia  (clothing)
  Iso (automobile)
  Isotta Fraschini 
  Itala 
  Italcementi 
  Italdesign Giugiaro 
  Italian Line 
  Italjet 
  Iveco 
  Kappa 
  Kartell 
  Keglevich 
  Kuota 
  La Molisana 
  Lagostina 
  Lamborghini 
  Lambretta 
  Lampre 
  Lancia 
  Landi Renzo 
  Landini (tractor)
  Larusmiani 
  Lavazza 
  Laverda 
  Laverda (harvesters)
  Lazzaroni 
  Lechler 
  Legea 
  Leitner Group 
  Leitwind 
  Leonardo 
  Levante (hosiery)
  Lima (models)
  List of automobile companies founded by the Ceirano brothers 
  Angelo Litrico 
  Liu·Jo 
  Lofra 
  Lombardini S.r.l. 
  Longoni 
  Lotto Sport Italia 
  Lucchini RS 
  Girolamo Luxardo 
  Luxottica 
  Macron (sportswear)
  Maggiora 
  Magneti Marelli 
  Maire Tecnimont 
  Majello 
  Malaguti 
  Malo 
  Malossi 
  Mandarina Duck 
  Manfrotto 
  Mapei 
  Marcegaglia 
  Mariella Burani Fashion Group 
  Marina Rinaldi 
  Marni (clothing)
  Martin Motors 
  Martini (vermouth)
  Martini & Rossi 
  Marzocchi 
  Marzotto 
  Maserati 
  Massimo Zanetti 
  Mateba 
  Max Mara 
  MCS (fashion brand)
  Mebetoys 
  Mecc Alte 
  Meccanotecnica Riesi 
  Mediaset 
  Mediashopping 
  Menarini 
  MER MEC 
  Meridiana 
  Messagenet 
  Metronapoli 
  Milano Assicurazioni 
  Minarelli 
  Missoni 
  Mivar 
  Moka pot 
  Molinari (design)
  Momo 
  Moncler 
  Arnoldo Mondadori Editore 
  Mondial (motorcycle manufacturer)
  Montegrappa 
  Moon Boot 
  Morbidelli 
  Moretti Motor Company 
  Moschino 
  Moto Guzzi 
  Moto Morini 
  Moto Rumi 
  Motobi 
  MV Agusta 
  Nardi (agricultural machinery manufacturer) 
  Nardi  (carmaker)
  Nardini  (grappa)
  Natuzzi 
  Nebiolo Printech 
  Nina Ricci 
  Nolan Helmets 
    Nonino (grappa)
  Nordica 
  Nutella
  Off-White 
  Officina Stellare 
  Officine Meccaniche 
  Officine Meccaniche Giovanni Cerutti 
  Officine Piccini S.p.A 
  Olidata 
  Olivetti 
  OMAS 
  Orsi Instrument Company 
  O.S.C.A. 
  OTO Melara 
  OZ Group 
  Pagani (automobile)
  Paglieri
  Paioli 
  Panerai 
  Panini Group 
  Panna (water)
  Pantofola d'Oro 
  Parmalat 
  Pastiglie Leone 
  Paton (motorcycles)
  Davide Pedersoli 
  Perazzi 
  Perini Navi 
  Perlini 
  Permasteelisa 
  Peroni Brewery 
  Peroni S.p.A. 
  Persol 
  PFM Group 
  Phonocar 
  Piaggio 
  Piaggio Aerospace 
  Pinarello 
  Pininfarina 
  Piquadro 
  Pircher Oberland 
  Pirelli 
  PMT Italia 
  Pocher 
  Pogliaghi 
  Polini 
  Poltrona Frau 
  Pomellato 
  Prada 
  Pro.Mecc 
  Proraso 
  Altaneve 
  Prysmian Group 
  Emilio Pucci 
  Radici Group 
  Radio Marconi 
  RAI 
  Rainbow S.r.l. 
  Giovanni Rana 
  Reggiane 
  John Richmond (fashion designer)
  Rivarossi 
  Roces 
  S.P.A. (automobile)
  Sacmi 
  Saeco 
  Safilo 
  SAI Ambrosini 
  Saipem 
  Salini Impregilo 
  Salvatore Ferragamo S.p.A. 
  SAME Deutz-Fahr
  San Carlo
  San Pellegrino 
  Sanfaustino 
  Santamaria (motorcycles)
  SCAM Srl 
  Scappino (fashion house)
  SCAT (automobile) 
  Seleco 
  Selex ES 
  SELEX Sistemi Integrati 
  Selle Royal
  Siae Microelettronica
  SIAI-Marchetti 
  Siata 
  SIDI 
  Siel 
  Sigma-Tau 
  Silca S.p.A. 
  Silvateam 
  Simmel Difesa 
  Simod 
  SIVI 
  SLAM (clothing)
  Smeg (appliances)
    Snaidero (furniture)
  Snam 
  SNIA S.p.A. 
  Società Italiana Ernesto Breda 
  Junior F.J.T.A. 
  Società Torinese Automobili Rapid 
  Soilmec 
  Somec 
  Sorin Group 
  Sparco 
  SPICA 
  Sportika SA 
  Standa 
  Automobili Stanguellini 
  Stappj 
  Sterilgarda 
  STET – Società Finanziaria Telefonica 
  Stone Island 
  Storero 
  Studiotorino 
  Suomy 
  Superga 
  Switchover Media 
  Tanfoglio 
  Tavernello
  Technogym 
  Tecnam 
  Tecnica Group 
  Teksid 
  Telecom Italia 
  Telespazio 
  Telit 
  Temperino 
  Terra Modena 
  Think Pink (clothing)
  Tic Tac 
  Tirrenia – Compagnia italiana di navigazione 
  Tiscali 
  Toscotec 
  ToyWatch 
  Trenitalia 
  A. Uberti, Srl. 
  UniCredit 
  UnoAErre 
  UPIM 
  Valentino SpA 
  Valpadana 
  Valsoia 
  Versace 
  Vespa 
  Viberti 
  Vibram 
  Visconti 
  Viscount  (musical instrument manufacturer)
  Vittoria S.p.A. 
  VM Motori 
  Voiello 
  Vulcanair 
  Vyrus 
  Weber carburetor 
  Wilier Triestina 
  WIND 
  Zamperla 
  Zanussi 
  Ermenegildo Zegna

See also

 Economy of Italy
 List of companies of Italy
 Lists of brands

Categories

 Aircraft manufacturers of Italy
 AnsaldoBreda
 Beer brands of Italy
 Cars of Italy
 Clothing brands of Italy
 Eni
 Fincantieri
 Food and drink companies of Italy
 Gio. Ansaldo & C.
 Leonardo S.p.A.
 
 Italian record labels
 Motor vehicle manufacturers of Italy
 Società Italiana Ernesto Breda

References

 
Italian brands
Brands